Stefano Di Chiara (born 21 February 1957) is an Italian former professional footballer and manager, who played as a defender, and is the older brother of footballer Alberto Di Chiara, whom he played with during his time at Lecce, helping the club to achieve Serie A promotion for the first time in their history in 1985.

Playing career
Di Chiara was born in Rome. During his career, he played for Lazio (1973–76), Pistoiese (1976–79), Genoa (1979–80), Cagliari (1980–81), Cremonese (1981–83), Lecce (1983–87), Messina (1987–1988), SPAL (1988–1989), L'Aquila (1989–90), and Ascoli (1990–91).

Management career
Di Chiara has managed Cerveteri, Latina, Civitavecchia, Bastia Umbra, Chieti, Siena, Fermana, Ravenna, Novara, Taranto, Legnano, Pistoiese, Cisco Roma and Viterbo.

In February 2009 he was appointed as new head coach of Lega Pro Seconda Divisione club Como. After guiding the team to promotion in the higher tier, in October 2009 he was fired due to poor results in the following Lega Pro Prima Divisione 2009–10 campaign.

Honours

Player
Pistoiese
Serie C: 1976–77

Lecce
Serie B: 1984–85

References

1957 births
Living people
Association football defenders
Italian footballers
Italian football managers
Serie A players
Serie B players
Cagliari Calcio players
Ascoli Calcio 1898 F.C. players
S.S. Lazio players
U.S. Lecce players
U.S. Cremonese players
A.C.R. Messina players
S.P.A.L. players
U.S. Pistoiese 1921 players
Genoa C.F.C. players
L'Aquila Calcio 1927 players
A.C.N. Siena 1904 managers
Ravenna F.C. managers
Novara F.C. managers
U.S. Pistoiese 1921 managers
A.S.D. Civitavecchia 1920 managers
Footballers from Rome